A sea shanty is a genre of folk song. 

Sea Shanty or Sea Shanties may also refer to:

Sea Shanties (High Tide album), 1969
Sea Shanties (Spiers and Boden album), 2002
 "Sea Shanty", a song by Quasi from Featuring "Birds" (1998)

See also
Shanty (disambiguation)